Derinsu is a village in the Pazar District, Rize Province, in Black Sea Region of Turkey. Its population is 176 (2021).

History 
According to list of villages in Laz language book (2009), name of the village is Zanati, which means "Laz homeland". Most villagers are ethnically Laz.

Geography

References

Villages in Pazar District, Rize
Laz settlements in Turkey